Ceyda Ateş  (born 14 October 1988 Ankara) is a Turkish actress.

She began acting at the age of five. She won a child beauty contest organized by Neşe Erberk. Since childhood, she played in numerous hit series.. She took acting lessons at the Barış Manço Cultural Centre. She presented the show 'Dizi Magazin' on Cine5.

Her first popular adult roles are Leyla in Kavak Yelleri adaptation of Dawson's Creek and hit period series "Elveda Rumeli". She acted as Hande in Adını Feriha Koydum. She played in "Yılanların Öcü" based from novel. With Engin Altan Düzyatan, she played in mini historical series Çırağan Baskını.

Filmography

References

External links
 
 

Living people
1987 births
Turkish film actresses
Actresses from Ankara
20th-century Turkish actresses
Turkish television actresses
Turkish child actresses
21st-century Turkish actresses